General elections were held in Tuvalu on 9 September 2019. There were 37 candidates seeking election to the Parliament, two of whom are women: Valisi Alimau, who was contesting in the Nukufetau electorate, and Puakena Boreham who was seeking re-election in the Nui electorate.

On 19 September 2019, Kausea Natano was voted into the office of Prime Minister of Tuvalu by a parliamentary majority consisting of 10 MPs. He thus replaced incumbent Enele Sopoaga, who had been holding the position for the past six years and was seeking re-election to a new term. Samuelu Teo was elected as Speaker of the Parliament of Tuvalu.

Electoral system
The Electoral Provisions (Parliament) Amendment Act 2019 increased the number of elected representatives for the electorate of Nukulaelae to become 2 PMs. So that each of the 8 island electorates is represented by 2 MPs (Niulakita is represented by the MPs from Niutao). The 16 members of Parliament are elected in eight two-member constituencies using multiple non-transferable vote. As there are no formal political parties, all candidates run as independents.

Results
In the Nukufetau electorate the caretaker prime minister, Enele Sopoaga, was returned to Parliament, however Satini Manuella, Taukelina Finikaso and Maatia Toafa, who were ministers, were not returned. Seven new members of Parliament were elected.

See also

 List of by-elections in Tuvalu
 Politics of Tuvalu
 List of Tuvalu MPs
 Elections and political parties in Tuvalu
 2019 in Oceania

References

Tuvalu
2019 in Tuvalu
Elections in Tuvalu
September 2019 events in Oceania
Non-partisan elections
Election and referendum articles with incomplete results